A highball is a mixed alcoholic drink composed of an alcoholic base spirit and a larger proportion of a non-alcoholic mixer, often a carbonated beverage. Examples include the Seven and Seven, Scotch and soda, gin and tonic, screwdriver (a.k.a. vodka and orange), fernet con coca, Tom Collins, and rum and Coke (a.k.a. Cuba libre with the addition of lime juice). A highball is typically served over ice in a large straight-sided highball glass or Collins glass.

Highballs are popular in Japan, often made with Japanese whisky as a haibōru (ハイボール), or mixed with shōchū as a chūhai (チューハイ). Various mixers can be specified by suffixing with -hai (〜ハイ), as in oolong highball (ウーロンハイ, ūron-hai).

Etymology
The name may refer to the practice of serving drinks in tall glasses, on the dining cars of trains powered by steam locomotives, where the engine would get up to speed and the ball that showed boiler pressure was at its high level, known as "highballing". Alternatively, the name may have come from early railroad signals with raised globes meaning "clear track ahead".

History
Initially, the most common highball was made with Scotch whisky and carbonated water, known simply as a 'Scotch and soda'.

See also

 List of cocktails

References

Cocktails
Lists of cocktails